This is a list of coats of arms of the United Kingdom, constituent parts, Crown Dependencies and its Overseas Territories.

United Kingdom

Countries of the United Kingdom

County council

Crown Dependencies

Overseas Territories

Gibraltar

The coat of arms of Gibraltar is the oldest in use in an overseas territory of the United Kingdom and is unique in that it dates from before the period of British colonial administration. The version used by the government of Gibraltar are the same as the royal coat of arms of the United Kingdom combined with a badge featuring the own coat of arms of Gibraltar.

Saint Helena, Ascension and Tristan da Cunha
Saint Helena, Ascension Island and Tristan da Cunha comprise one British Overseas Territory. There is no flag or coat of arms for the entire territory; each of the constituent parts has its own insignia.

Historical

Cities

England

Northern Ireland

Scotland

Wales

Jersey

See also
 List of English counties' coats of arms
 Flags of British overseas territories and crown dependencies